Charles Howard, 10th Duke of Norfolk, Earl Marshal (1 December 172031 August 1786), was an English peer and politician. He was the son of Henry Charles Howard (d. 10 June 1720) and Mary Aylward (d. 7 October 1747). His father was a grandson of the 15th Earl of Arundel. He married Katherine Brockholes (d. 21 November 1784), daughter of John Brockholes, on 8 November 1739, and succeeded to the title of Duke of Norfolk in 1777 after the death of his cousin Edward Howard, 9th Duke of Norfolk.

Charles Howard died on 31 August 1786, at age 65, and was succeeded by his son Charles Howard, 11th Duke of Norfolk.

Family
The children of Charles and his wife Katherine were:
 Lady Mary Howard (June 1742–Nov. 1756, unmarried)
 Charles Howard, 11th Duke of Norfolk (1746–1815)

Family tree

References

 
 Burke's Peerage & Gentry, 107th Edition

Norfolk, Charles Howard, 10th Duke of
Norfolk, Charles Howard, 10th Duke of
Norfolk, Charles Howard, 10th Duke of
310
28
306
8th Earl of Norfolk
17
Charles Howard, 10th Duke of Norfolk
Fellows of the Royal Society